Do Not Disturb is the thirteenth studio album by British progressive rock band Van der Graaf Generator. It was released, on Esoteric Recordings, on 30 September 2016.

Background 
Reviewing the album for TeamRock, Kris Needs reported that vocalist Peter Hammill had sent organist Hugh Banton and drummer Guy Evans a CD of the new songs, which they spent a week rehearsing, another week recording backing tracks, then six months overdubbing and tweaking at their home studios. Of the album, Needs said:
If, as Peter Hammill has indicated, this is the last Van der Graaf album, these winners of Prog’s Lifetime Achievement award this year are going out with the kind of mind-joltingly gorgeous roller coaster that made them one of the greatest genuinely progressive bands of all time. But there’s also a noticeably reflective aura and sense of closure around their 13th album...

Reception 
Reviewing the album for RTÉ, Paddy Kehoe describes the track "(Oh No I Must Have Said) Yes" as "so prog it kind of parodies the genre itself.. " In the tracks "Brought to Book" and "Go", Kehoe sees the spirit of Richard Wright "somehow wafting about." Kehoe writes:
There is sometimes on the album a languorous air of Pink Floyd’s haunted pastoralism, or you could imagine Floyd’s keyboards maestro, the late Richard Wright singing one or two of the songs. "Alfa Berlina" opens with choral voices looped backwards and traffic noises. “I’ve got a lifetime's library of unreliable mementos” begin the lyrics – these guys have lived, and then some. Forever Falling's Gibson guitar groove is reminiscent of Jethro Tull, and, like many of the other tracks, it suddenly shifts tempo about a minute in. How on earth did they rehearse these things? One gathers a lot of earnest work went into the creation of this record.

Writing in The Quietus, Richard Rees Jones says that the album has nothing to rival the dark majesty of Van der Graaf Generator's classic 1970s work. He advises newcomers to start with Still Life, Godbluff or Pawn Hearts. But he still sees the album  as ".. a worthy addition to the group’s canon and – if this is indeed their last album – a fitting end to an illustrious career". He says:
To a greater extent here than on previous trio outings, VdGG make efforts to compensate for the absence of Jackson with a more varied instrumental palette. These songs are like compressed multi-part epics, lurching deliriously from moments of piano-led tranquillity to ragged guitar-and-drums freakouts. Banton augments his organ work with deep, resonant bass and tender washes of accordion, there’s a (tad overlong, to tell the truth) jazzy break in the middle of the exuberant rocker "(Oh No I Must Have Said) Yes", while the frenetic instrumental coda to "Almost the Words" is as wild and driven as anything you’ll hear all year. Only on the plaintive closing track “Go” does the mood finally darken, with Hammill’s tone of weary resignation looming over Banton’s desolate organ: "more or less, all for the best, in the end it’s all behind you."

Track listing

Personnel

Musicians
 Peter Hammill – vocals, guitars, pianos
 Hugh Banton – organs, keyboards, bass, accordion, glockenspiel
 Guy Evans – drums, percussion

Technical
 Coordinator – Mark Powell, Vicky Powell
 Design, artwork – Paul Ridout
 Engineer – Ben Turner
 Mastering – Christian Wright
 Photography – Tamra Gray

Charts

References

External links 
 Van der Graaf Generator - Do Not Disturb (2016) - at AllMusic.com
 Van der Graaf Generator - Do Not Disturb (2016) - at Discogs.com
 Van der Graaf Generator - Do Not Disturb (2016) - at ProgArchives.com
 Van der Graaf Generator - Do Not Disturb (2016) - stream at Spotify.com

Van der Graaf Generator albums
2016 albums